A disintegrin and metalloproteinase with thrombospondin motifs 12 is an enzyme that in humans is encoded by the ADAMTS12 gene.

This gene encodes a member of the ADAMTS (a disintegrin and metalloproteinase with thrombospondin motifs) protein family. Members of the family share several distinct protein modules, including a propeptide region, a metalloproteinase domain, a disintegrin-like domain, and a thrombospondin type 1 (TS-1) motif. Individual members of this family differ in the number of C-terminal TS-1 motifs, and some have unique C-terminal domains. The enzyme encoded by this gene contains eight TS-1 motifs. It may play roles in pulmonary cells during fetal development or in tumor processes through its proteolytic activity or as a molecule potentially involved in regulation of cell adhesion.

References

Further reading

External links
 The MEROPS online database for peptidases and their inhibitors: M12.237
 

ADAMTS